The Glide Ranger Station in Umpqua National Forest near Glide, Oregon was built in 1938 by the Civilian Conservation Corps.  It served historically as a government office.  It was listed on the National Register of Historic Places in 1986 for its architecture.  It was designed by architects of the United States Forest Service in Rustic and other architecture.

In 1986 the station building was in excellent condition.  It is a one-story wood-frame building on a concrete foundation, with gables, timbers, and stone steps.  Decorative features include pine tree shaped cutouts in shutters and pine tree designs centered in each gable end.

References

United States Forest Service ranger stations
Civilian Conservation Corps in Oregon
Park buildings and structures on the National Register of Historic Places in Oregon
Government buildings completed in 1938
Buildings and structures in Douglas County, Oregon
Rustic architecture in Oregon
National Register of Historic Places in Douglas County, Oregon
1938 establishments in Oregon